Ogieniowo, known until 2012 as Ogieniewo  is a village in the administrative district of Gmina Brodnica, within Śrem County, Greater Poland Voivodeship, in west-central Poland. From 1975 to 1998, Ogieniowo administratively belonged to Poznań Voivodeship.

References

Ogieniowo